The 2019–20 Wessex Football League season (known as the Sydenhams Football League (Wessex) for sponsorship reasons) was the 34th in the history of the Wessex Football League since its establishment in 1986. The league consisted of two divisions: the Premier Division and Division One. The season was abandoned on 26 March 2020, due to the COVID-19 pandemic.

The constitution was announced on 19 May 2019. This season, the Premier Division champions were to be promoted to Step 4. The runners-up in this division and ten other Step 5 divisions in other leagues were to be ranked according to PPG (points per game), and the top four in that ranking would also have been promoted. The remaining seven runners-up would have competed in "winner takes all" play-offs with seven clubs finishing bottom in Step 4 leagues, the winners being placed at Step 4 and the losers at Step 5 for 2020–21.

The bottom clubs in all 14 Step 5 divisions were to be ranked according to PPG, and the 12 lowest-ranked clubs were to be relegated to Step 6.

In Division One, the top four clubs were to be promoted to Step 5, with the bottom two liable to relegation to Step 7.

League suspension and abandonment
Despite other leagues suspending all matches from 13 March due to the COVID-19 pandemic, the Wessex League continued to hold matches on 14 March. On 16 March, the Football Association decided to postpone all matches across all their competitions until 3 April, and a league statement confirmed the postponement of all matches for the foreseeable future.

On 26 March 2020, the league season was formally abandoned, with all results being expunged, and no promotion or relegation taking place to, from, or between the two divisions. On 30 March, sixty-six non-league clubs sent an open letter to the Football Association requesting that they reconsider their decision.

Premier Division
The Premier Division remained at 20 clubs after Sholing were promoted to the Southern League, and Andover New Street and Bemerton Heath Harlequins were relegated to Division One. Three teams joined the division:

AFC Stoneham, champions of Division One.
Amesbury Town, runners-up in Division One.
Fleet Town, relegated from the Southern League Division One South.
Team Solent F.C. were renamed Solent University F.C.

League table at the time of abandonment

Division One
Division One was increased from 19 clubs to 20 after AFC Stoneham and Amesbury Town were promoted to the Premier Division. Three clubs joined the division:

Andover New Street, relegated from the Premier Division.
Bemerton Heath Harlequins, relegated from the Premier Division.
Pewsey Vale, transferred from Hellenic League Division One West.

League table at the time of abandonment

References

External links
 Wessex Football League official site

Wessex Football League seasons
9
Wessex Football League